Arthurton is a town and locality in the Australian state of South Australia.

Arthurton was established on 25 January 1877. It was named after Arthur, the son of South Australian Governor Anthony Musgrave, who insisted on this name after it had already been named "Kalkabury".

See also
 List of cities and towns in South Australia

References

Towns in South Australia
Yorke Peninsula